Tlacolulita Zapotec (Southeastern Yautepec Zapotec) is a Zapotec language of Oaxaca, Mexico. It is not closely related to other languages.

References

Zapotec languages